The Sanaga pygmy herring (Thrattidion noctivagus) is an extremely small fish related to the herring which is endemic to the Sanaga River in Cameroon. It is the only species in its genus.

References

Sanaga pygmy herring
Fish of Cameroon
Endemic fauna of Cameroon
Sanaga pygmy herring